The Pierre Laporte Bridge is the longest main span suspension bridge in Canada.

It was originally named the New Quebec Bridge (Nouveau pont de Québec) and was supposed to be called Pont Frontenac (Frontenac Bridge) until it was renamed in honour of Quebec Vice-Premier Pierre Laporte, who was kidnapped and murdered during the October Crisis of 1970 as construction of the bridge was nearing completion. The bridge was constructed for the Province of Quebec, Department of Roads in a joint venture with the private firm of Parsons Transportation Group.

It carries Autoroute 73, north from Autoroute 20, the Trans-Canada Highway, to Quebec City and Autoroute 40, and northwards towards Saguenay.



Specifications
Constructed: 1966-1970
Main span:  
Side spans:  each
Total length:  between anchorages
Deck: Six-lane freeway bridge
Capacity: 90,000 vehicles per day

See also
List of crossings of the Saint Lawrence River
List of bridges in Canada

References

External links

 
 Pierre Laporte Bridge (A-73) on Steve Anderson's MontrealRoads.com
 Google 3D warehouse

Laporte
Bridges over the Saint Lawrence River
Suspension bridges in Canada
Transport in Lévis, Quebec
Buildings and structures in Lévis, Quebec
Road bridges in Quebec
Bridges completed in 1970
1970 establishments in Quebec